MasterChef India is an Indian Hindi-language competitive cooking reality show based on MasterChef Australia and is part of MasterChef India. Produced by Endemol Shine, it premiered on 16 October 2010 on Star Plus.

Format
MasterChef India initial rounds consist of many contestants from across India individually auditioning by presenting a dish before the three judges to gain one of 50 semi-final places.

The semi-finalists then compete in several challenges which test their food knowledge and preparation skills. In Season 1 and 2, the top 50 competed until 12 were left, with the final 12 progressing to the main stage of the show. The winner competes for a prize that includes their own cookery show, the chance to have their own cookbook published, and  1,00,00,000 in cash.

Series

Season 1

MasterChef India 1 aired from 16 October 2010 to 25 December 2010 on Star Plus. Hosted by Akshay Kumar, Kunal Kapur and Ajay Chopra, it was won by Pankaj Bhadouria.

Season 2
MasterChef India 2 aired from 22 October 2011 to 1 January 2012 on Star Plus. Hosted by Vikas Khanna, Kunal Kapur and Ajay Chopra, it was won by Shipra Khanna. Nita Mehta and Bijou Thaangjam also participated in the program.

Season 3
MasterChef India 3 aired from 11 March 2013 to 9 June 2013 on Star Plus. While the previous seasons were on weekends, this season aired during weekdays. Hosted by Vikas Khanna, Kunal Kapur and Sanjeev Kapoor, Written by Gunjan Joshi, it was won by Ripudaman Handa.

Junior MasterChef India

Junior MasterChef India aired from 17 August 2013 to 2 November 2013 on Star Plus. Titled Junior Masterchef Swaad Ke Ustaad, it was won by Sarthak Bhardwaj.

Season 4

MasterChef India 4 aired from 26 January 2015 to 12 April 2015 on Star Plus. For the first time in the history of MasterChef, a pure vegetarian format was introduced. Hosted by Sanjeev Kapoor, Vikas Khanna and Ranveer Brar, Written by Gunjan Joshi, it was won by Nikita Gandhi.

Season 5

MasterChef India 5 aired from 1 October 2016 to 25 December 2016 on Star Plus. Hosted by Vikas Khanna, Kunal Kapur and Zorawar Kalra. Kirti Bhoutika won the competition, with Ashima Arora finishing in the second place.

Season 6

MasterChef India 6 aired from 7 December 2019 to 1 March 2020 on Star Plus. Hosted by Vikas Khanna, Ranveer Brar and Vineet Bhatia, Written by Gunjan Joshi. The winner was Abinas Nayak, with Oindrila Bala as the runner-up.

Season 7

The seventh season of the Hindi version of MasterChef India was announced on August 5, 2022. It is hosted by chefs and there are some allegations of bias in the show by the judges Vikas Khanna, Ranveer Brar and Garima Arora. It started airing from 2nd January 2023 on SET and is also available on Sony's OTT platform SonyLIV.

Production

Development
In 2010, Star India licensed the rights for producing MasterChef India in Hindi.

From 2023, the show will air on Sony Entertainment Television.

Reception
Season 1 opened with an average ratings of 2.6 TVR. The following week, it garnered 2.5 TVR. Overall it ranged around over 2 and 3 TVR. The finale garnered the highest viewership rating of 4.2 TVR.

Season 2 premiered with 2.01 TVR and ended with 2.6 TVR.

Season 3 opened with 2.2 TVR while the following weeks garnered a decent ratings between 2 and 2.3 TVR the finale became the most watched reality show of the week with 3.7 TVR.

Season 6 garnered low ratings ranging 0.8 and 1.1 TRP.

References

External links
 Official website of MasterChef India Season 2
 Official website of MasterChef India Season 3

 
Indian game shows
2010 Indian television series debuts
StarPlus original programming
Indian television series based on British television series
Indian cooking television series
Hindi-language Disney+ Hotstar original programming